Paula Schwartz (1925-2003) was an American playwright and novelist.  Schwartz was the author of 36 Regency romance novels under the pen name Elizabeth Mansfield and of mainstream fiction under the name Paula Reibel, Paula Jonas, and Paula Reid.

Schwartz was born in the Bronx neighborhood of New York City.  She graduated from Hunter College and earned her M.A. in English from the City University of New York.

Schwartz taught drama and English and drama in New York and moved to Washington, D.C. in 1965 where she taught English at Dunbarton College of Holy Cross, Washington, D.C., a women's college.  She began to write novels when the College closed in 1973.  She lived in Annandale, Virginia.

Schwartz's musical, An Accident At Lyme, an adaptation of Jane Austen's novel Persuasion, was staged in Baltimore in 1986  by Theatre Hopkins.

Books

As Paula Reibel
 A Morning Moon; a Jewish family saga spanning the years from 1895–1933. (1984, Morrow)

As Elizabeth Mansfield

As Paula Reid 

 Rachel's Passage; An historical novel set in America at the turn of the 19th century, exploring marital abandonment, marriage, and "criminal conversation" (1998 )

As Paula Jonas 

 To Spite the Devil; An historical novel set in Revolutionary America, in what is now currently one of the boroughs of New York City. (1994 ). This novel is based on the musical The Tory Spinster, by Paula Schwartz and Neil Moyer (1975).

Plays and musicals

Musicals 
Schwartz collaborated with composers Neil Moyer and Howard Levetsky on several musical projects.

 The Tory Spinster, (with Neil Moyer) a musical set in Revolutionary America, won the Delaware Bicentennial Playwriting Contest, sponsored by the Delaware Theatre Association, and was performed in April and May 1975.
 An Accident At Lyme, (with Neil Moyer), a musical adaptation of Jane Austen's Persuasion

Plays 

 Parcel Pickup, a one-act play published in Dramatics Magazine, 1973

References

External links
 Elizabeth Mansfield (Wayback machine)
 Elizabeth Mansfield 

20th-century American novelists
Novelists from New York (state)
2003 deaths
American romantic fiction writers
American historical novelists
Women romantic fiction writers
American women novelists
20th-century American women writers
Women historical novelists
1925 births
21st-century American women